James Robert Brophy (born 25 July 1994) is an English professional footballer who plays as a winger for League One club Cambridge United.

Career

Swindon Town
Brophy joined Swindon Town in the summer of 2015 after several years playing in non-League football, with numerous clubs including Woodlands United, Belstone, Broadfields United and Edgware Town. The defender made his professional football debut as a second-half substitute in the League Cup game against Exeter City. He scored his first goal for the club against Queens Park Rangers in an EFL Cup tie on 10 August 2016.

Leyton Orient
On 21 September 2017, Brophy joined National League side Leyton Orient on a three-month loan deal until January 2018. Two days later, he made his Orient debut during their 2–2 away draw with Aldershot Town, featuring for the entire 90 minutes. On 24 November 2017, Brophy was recalled by parent club, Swindon, following increasing injury problems. He rejoined Leyton Orient on a permanent basis on 31 January 2018, signing a -year deal. Brophy was offered a new deal as his contract was due to be up at the end of June 2021 however he decided to turn down the offer to join Cambridge United F.C. He left the club making 149 appearances.

Cambridge United
On 11 June 2021, Brophy joined newly promoted EFL League One side Cambridge United F.C. on a three-year deal.

Career statistics

Honours
Leyton Orient
National League: 2018–19
FA Trophy runner-up: 2018–19

References

External links

1994 births
Living people
English footballers
Association football defenders
Broadfields United F.C. players
Edgware Town F.C. players
Swindon Town F.C. players
Leyton Orient F.C. players
Cambridge United F.C. players
English Football League players
National League (English football) players
Footballers from the London Borough of Brent
Harrow Borough F.C. players